André Mernier (born 26 May 1943) is former Secretary General of the Energy Charter Secretariat: He served in this post from 2006 to 2011. He is retired since January 2012.

André Mernier is married and has two children.

Early life
In 1963–1972 Mernier served as an officer in the Belgian Armed Forces and prior to that attended a military academy in Brussels. In 1973 he received a law degree from the University of Louvain.

Foreign service
In 1975 André Mernier joined the Ministry of Foreign Affairs of Belgium.

 1976 - Vice-Consul at the Consulate in Amsterdam 
 1977-1978 - Chargé d'affaires at the Embassy in Cyprus 
 1978-1981 - Permanent Representation of Belgium to the NATO
 1981-1985 - First Secretary at the Embassy in Washington, D.C. 
 1985-1988 - Consul at the Consulate in East Berlin 
 1988-1990 - Chief of the Belgian Military Mission in West Berlin and Consul General of Belgium 
 1990-1994 - Ambassador of Belgium to the Republic of Korea 
 1994 - 1996 - Director of the Disarmament Section, Ministry of Foreign Affairs 
 1996-1999 - Ambassador of Belgium in Geneva 
 2000-2004 - Ambassador of Belgium in Moscow, accredited also to Belarus, Moldova, Armenia, Georgia, Uzbekistan, Tajikistan, Kyrgyzstan and Kazakhstan
 2005 - Director of Energy Services, Ministry of Foreign Affairs

External links
 Biographical Note by the UN
 Press release by the Energy Charter Secretariat

1943 births
Living people
Belgian soldiers
Belgian diplomats
People associated with energy
Ambassadors of Belgium to South Korea
Ambassadors of Belgium to Russia
Ambassadors of Belgium to Switzerland
Ambassadors of Belgium to Belarus
Ambassadors of Belgium to Moldova
Ambassadors of Belgium to Armenia
Ambassadors of Belgium to Georgia (country)
Ambassadors of Belgium to Uzbekistan
Ambassadors of Belgium to Tajikistan
Ambassadors of Belgium to Kyrgyzstan
Ambassadors of Belgium to Kazakhstan